Eugenio Dal Corso (born 16 May 1939) is an Italian prelate of the Catholic Church who led two dioceses in Angola, as Coadjutor and Bishop of Saurimo from 1996 to 2008 and as Bishop of Benguela from 2008 to 2018. He is a professed member of the Poor Servants of Divine Providence and worked as a missionary in Argentina and Angola from 1975 to 1996.

Pope Francis raised him to the rank of cardinal on 5 October 2019.

Life
Eugenio Dal Corso was born in Lugo di Valpantena di Grezzana near Verona on 16 May 1939 as the second of six children to Rodolfo Dal Corso and Teresa Bellorio; he was given the name "Eugenio" to honor Pope Pius XII who was elected pope two months earlier.

From the age of ten he attended the Don Calabria Institute and there decided to become a missionary. Dal Corso made his religious profession in the Poor Servants of Divine Providence religious congregation in 1956 and was ordained in the Casa di Nazareth on 7 July 1963. He then completed his studies in dogmatics while he also doing pastoral work in the Madonna di Campagna parish in Verona as well as in Naples. He also taught theology from 1967 to 1968. Dal Corso began his career as a missionary in the city of Laferrere in Buenos Aires Province in January 1975, where he helped educate new priests. After just over a decade there, he was assigned to the missions in Luanda, Angola, in March 1986. One of his projects there was the construction of a seminary in Uíje In 1991 he was appointed the Provincial Superior of his order in Angola. 

Pope John Paul II appointed Dal Corso the Coadjutor Bishop of Saurimo on 15 December 1995. He received his episcopal consecration on 3 March 1996 from Archbishop Félix del Blanco Prieto, with Bishops Andrea Veggio and Pedro Marcos Ribeiro da Costa serving as the principal co-consecrators. He became Bishop of Saurimo when his predecessor retired on 15 January 1997. On 18 February 2008, Pope Benedict XVI named him Bishop of Benguela. Pope Francis accepted his resignation on 26 March 2018 at the age of 78.

Pope Francis announced on 1 September 2019 that he would make Dal Corso a cardinal. On 5 October 2019, Pope Francis made him Cardinal Priest of Sant'Anastasia al Palatino.

Notes

See also
Cardinals created by Francis
Catholic Church in Angola

References

External links
 Catholic Hierarchy 

 

1939 births
Bishops appointed by Pope John Paul II
Living people
Roman Catholic missionaries in Angola
Cardinals created by Pope Francis
20th-century Italian cardinals
Angolan cardinals
Italian Roman Catholic missionaries
Roman Catholic bishops of Benguela
Roman Catholic bishops of Saurímo